The New National Museum of Monaco often abbreviated to NMNM, is a museum of contemporary visual art in Monaco. The museum is situated in two locations, the Villa Sauber and the Villa Paloma. The venues display two exhibitions annually.

Recent exhibitions have retrospectives of Erik Bulatov and Yinka Shonibare and 'Monacopolis', an exhibition on architecture, town planning and urbanisation in Monaco. The museum also holds an extensive collection of works relating to painter Kees van Dongen.

Notable people
 Marie-Claude Beaud, director of New National Museum of Monaco, 2009-2021

See also
 List of museums in Monaco

References

External links
Official site

Modern art museums
Museums in Monaco
Monaco